Mike Mullins (born Auckland, 29 October 1970) is a former New Zealand-born Irish rugby union footballer. He played primarily as an outside centre.

Rugby career
Mullins represented Munster playing 116 games. He had 16 caps for Ireland, from his debut, at 26 August 1999, with Argentina, to 2003 final test versus Manu Samoa in Apia. He played at the 1999 Rugby World Cup finals against Romania, and in the Six Nations Championship, in 2000 and 2001.

Coaching career
Up until the end of 2014, Mike Mullins was the coach of the North Otago Heartland championship team, who won the Meades Cup in October 2007.

Personal life
Mullins was born in New Zealand, his mother Sharon of Irish Maori descent, his father Thomas born and bred in Limerick hence his eligibility for Ireland.

References

External links
Mike Mullins ESPN Scrum

1970 births
Ireland international rugby union players
Irish rugby union coaches
Irish rugby union players
Living people
Munster Rugby players
New Zealand people of Irish descent
New Zealand rugby union coaches
New Zealand rugby union players
Rugby union centres
West Hartlepool R.F.C. players
Young Munster players
Rugby union players from Auckland
Citizens of Ireland through descent